The Republican Party of India (RPI, often called the Republican Party or simply Republican) is a political party in India. It had its roots in the Scheduled Castes Federation led by B. R. Ambedkar. The 'Training School for Entrance to Politics' was established by Ambedkar in 1956 which was to serve as an entry point to the Republican Party of India (RPI). The first batch of the school consisted of 15 students. Its first batch turned out to be last batch as the school was closed after Ambedkar's death in 1956.

Origins

Independent Labour Party 
The Independent Labour Party (ILP) was a political Organisation formed under the leadership of B. R. Ambedkar on 15 August 1936. It opposed the caste and capitalist structures in India, supported the Indian working class and sought to dismantle the caste in India.
	 
The formation of the ILP was not welcomed or supported by the communist leaders, who argued that it would lead to a split in the working-class votes. Ambedkar replied that communist leaders were working for the rights for the worker but not for the human rights of Dalit workers. In his work Annihilation of Caste, Ambedkar put forth the idea that caste is not merely the 'division of labour' but 'division of labourers' based upon graded inequality.
	 
In the 1937 Provincial elections, the ILP secured 14 of the 17 seats in which they contested. This included 11 of the 13 contested seats that were reserved for traditionally oppressed communities.
	 
In 1938, the ILP, with the support of the Congress Socialist Party, organised a march of 20,000 tenants from the Konkan region to Bombay, marked the largest pre-independence peasant mobilisation in the region. In the same year, it also joined with Communists to organise Bombay textile labourers in opposition to the Industrial Disputes Bill intended to control strike actions by the labourers. ILP opposed the bill in the Bombay Legislative Assembly.

Scheduled Castes Federation 

Scheduled Castes Federation (SCF) was an organisation in India founded by B. R. Ambedkar in 1942 to campaign for the rights of the Dalit community. An executive body of All India SCF was elected in the convention. N. Sivaraj from Madras State was elected as President and P. N. Rajbhoj from Bombay State was elected as general secretary, including founder body member P. T. Madhale and others.

Ambedkar had founded the Depressed Classes Federation (DCF) in 1930 and the Independent Labour Party (ILP) in 1935. Sources vary regarding which of these two bodies was succeeded by the SCF.
SCF later evolved into the Republican Party of India.

There was also a party called Scheduled Caste Federation in Pakistan after Partition. Ramnarayan Rawat stated that the SCF "created the space for an alternative to Congress-type 'nationalist' politics in post- 1947 Uttar Pradesh".

Republican Party of India 
On 30 September 1956, B. R. Ambedkar had announced the establishment of the "Republican Party of India" by dismissing the "Scheduled Castes Federation", but before the formation of the party, he died on 6 December 1956. After that, his followers and activists planned to form this party. A meeting of the Presidency was held at Nagpur on 1 October 1957 to establish the party. At this meeting, N. Sivaraj, Yashwant Ambedkar, P. T. Borale, A. G. Pawar, Datta Katti, Dadasaheb Rupwate , Abba P. T. Madhale were present. The Republican Party of India was formed on 3 October 1957. N. Sivaraj was elected as the President of the party.

In 1957, six members of the party were elected to the second Lok Sabha. This is the biggest achievement of Ambedkar's party so far.

Factionism
During the recent years RPI suffered severe internal strife. Several distinct parties claim the name of RPI. There are more than 50 factions of RPI. In 2009, all factions of RPI except Prakash Ambedkar's Bharipa Bahujan Mahasangh reunited to form a united "Republican Party of India (United)". One of the main people responsible for this was Rabbi Madan. Later, Republican Party of India (Gavai) and Republican Party of India (A) led by Ramdas Athawale split again from the united party. Splinter groups of RPI include:
Republican Party of India (A) of Ramdas Athawale
Republican Party of India (A) of M.G. Nagamani
Peoples Republican Party Jogendra Kawade
Republican Party of India (United)
Republican Party of India (Gavai) of R. S. Gavai and Rajendra Gavai
Bharipa Bahujan Mahasangh of Prakash Ambedkar
Rashtriya Republican Party of Annasaheb Katare
Republican Party of India (S) of Shyam Gaikwad
Bahujan Samaj Party founder Kanshi Ram worked with RPI for eight years.

References 

 
Political parties established in 1957
1957 establishments in Bihar
Ambedkarite political parties
Progressive parties
Secularist organizations
B. R. Ambedkar